Megalographa bonaerensis is a moth of the family Noctuidae. It is found from southern Brazil and Paraguay southward to northern Argentina and Chile.

External links
 A review of the genus Megalographa Lafontaine and Poole (Lepidoptera: Noctuidae: Plusiinae) with the description of a new species from Costa Rica

Plusiinae